Lieutenant-General Day Hort MacDowall DL (3 July 1795 – 14 September 1870) was a British Army officer who served as colonel of the 3rd (the East Kent) Regiment of Foot.

Military career
MacDowall was commissioned as an ensign on 15 April 1813 and then served as a major in the 44th Regiment of Foot. He became colonel of the 3rd (the East Kent) Regiment of Foot and was promoted to lieutenant-general in 1866. As the 22nd MacDowall of Garthland, MacDowall was also a Scottish laird.

References

British Army generals
Deputy Lieutenants of Renfrewshire
1795 births
1870 deaths